Rosalind Frances Croucher  (born 14 November 1954) is an Australian lawyer and academic who is the current President of the Australian Human Rights Commission, in office since July 2017. She was previously President of the Australian Law Reform Commission from December 2009 until July 2017, having served as a full-time commissioner since 2007.

Education
Croucher graduated with a Bachelor of Arts with Honours and a Bachelor of Laws from the University of Sydney and completed her Doctor of Philosophy in legal history at the University of New South Wales. She was admitted as a legal practitioner in New South Wales in 1981.

Academic career
In 1997 to 1998, Croucher was the Acting Dean of the Sydney Law School and then the Deputy Chair of the University of Sydney Academic Board in 1999. She then moved to Macquarie University as the Dean of the Macquarie Law School from 1999 to 2007. From 2002 to 2003, Croucher was the Chair of the Council of Australian Law Deans and the Vice-President of the International Academy of Estate and Trust Law from 2000 to 2005.

Croucher's academic expertise as a lecturer and researcher is in the fields of equity, trusts, property, inheritance and legal history. She has written or edited nine books, including Succession: Families, Property and Death, Families and Estates: A Comparative Study, and Law and Religion – God, the State and the Common Law. She has also authored over 100 publications including book chapters, encyclopedia entries, journal articles, casenotes and conference papers.

Law Reform Commission
Croucher was appointed a full-time Commissioner of the Australian Law Reform Commission by the Howard Government in 2007 and was made President in 2009. Croucher was reappointed President in 2014 and subsequently in 2015 for a further three-year term.

Croucher was the Commissioner-in-charge of nine significant law reform inquiries including into Client Legal Privilege, Secrecy Laws, Family Violence, Discovery, Age Barriers, Disability Laws, the Freedoms Inquiry, and the Elder Abuse Inquiry.

Human Rights Commission

On 20 June 2017, Attorney-General George Brandis announced that Croucher would be appointed President of the Australian Human Rights Commission in place of Gillian Triggs. Her seven-year term began on 30 July 2017.

In March 2018, Croucher wrote a report recommending that compensation be awarded to a man because he was refused employment by banking and insurance company Suncorp Group. The man had previously been convicted and sentenced to 12 months’ jail in 2008 for accessing child pornography via a “carriage service” and for possession of child pornography, and did not disclose the convictions to the company in his initial online application. Croucher defended her report on the basis that, under Australian law, people should not be discriminated against in employment because of their criminal record, if the criminal record did not prevent them from carrying out the "inherent requirements" of the job.

Honours
Croucher was honoured as a Foundation Fellow of the Australian Academy of Law in 2007. She was appointed an Honorary Fellow of St Andrew's College of the University of Sydney in 2002, a Honorary Fellow of the Australian College of Legal Medicine in 2004, and a Honorary Life Member of the Women Lawyers’ Association of New South Wales in 2013.

She was recognised as one of the 40 ‘inspirational alumni’ of the University of New South Wales in 2011 and was acknowledged for her contributions to public policy as one of Australia's ‘100 Women of Influence’ by the Australian Financial Review and Westpac.

Croucher was appointed a Member of the Order of Australia in the 2015 Australia Day Honours list for “significant service to the law as an academic, to legal reform and education, to professional development, and to the arts”.

Personal life
Croucher is married to fellow academic John Croucher. Her father, Frank McGrath, was a judge, and her maternal grandfather, John Cumpston, was the first Director-General of Public Health of the Commonwealth Department of Health. She was named after Rosalind in As You Like It. She played the oboe and cor anglais in the Australian Youth Orchestra in 1974.

References

1954 births
Living people
Australian women lawyers
University of Sydney alumni
Academic staff of the University of Sydney
University of New South Wales alumni
Academic staff of Macquarie University
Members of the Order of Australia
Fellows of the Australian Academy of Law
Human rights in Australia
Law reform in Australia